Magdalena Municipal Schools is a school district headquartered in Magdalena, New Mexico. It covers Magdalena and Alamo. It consists of an elementary school, a middle school, and a high school.

In the 1950s American Indian children living in Alamo, previously attending distant boarding schools, began attending Magdalena schools after the Bureau of Indian Affairs (BIA) had a dormitory built in Magdalena in 1957. In 1979 the Alamo Navajo Community School opened in Alamo, drawing Alamo students away from Magdalena schools.

In 2020, during the COVID-19 pandemic in New Mexico, the administration decided to do virtual learning until at least Labor Day.

References

External links
 Magdalena Municipal Schools

School districts in New Mexico
Education in Socorro County, New Mexico
Education on the Navajo Nation